Statilia is a genus of praying mantis that resembles dead or living grass.  Statilia species live in Australia, Africa, Asia and islands.

Species
The Mantodea Species File lists:
Statilia agresta Zheng, 1987
Statilia apicalis Saussure, 1871
Statilia chayuensis Zhang, 1983
Statilia flavobrunnea Zhang, 1984
Statilia maculata Thunberg, 1784
S. maculata maculata Thungberg, 1784
S. maculata continentalis Werner, 1935
Statilia major Werner, 1922
Statilia nemoralis Saussure 1870 - type species
Statilia nobilis Brunner, 1893
Statilia occibivittata Yang 1997 
Statilia ocellata Uvarov, 1922
Statilia pallida Werner, 1922
Statilia spanis Wang, 1993
Statilia viridibrunnea Zhang, 1984

See also
List of mantis genera and species
Chinese Mantis

References

External links
 

Mantidae
Insects of Asia
Mantodea of Africa
Insects of Australia
Insects of Timor
Mantodea genera
Taxa named by Carl Stål